Hett may refer to:
 Hett, County Durham, England
 Hett, a nickname for the name Hettie
 Benjamin Carter Hett, a historian of Germany and 2009 Guggenheim Fellowship winner

See also
 Het (disambiguation)
 Hat (disambiguation)
 Hats (disambiguation)
 Hatt (disambiguation)